The Gender Balance Council (GBC) is an Emirati federal entity responsible for developing and implementing the gender balance agenda in the United Arab Emirates.

The Council is chaired by Manal bint Mohammed bin Rashid Al Maktoum, President of Dubai Women Establishment. The Council's responsibility including reviewing current legislation, policies and programs, and proposing or updating new legislation or programs in order to achieve gender balance in the workplace as well as reduce the gender gap across all government sectors, enhance the UAE's ranking in global competitiveness reports on gender equality and achieve gender balance in decision-making positions, as well as promote the UAE's status as a benchmark for gender balance legislation.

History 

In August 2016 the GBC announced the establishment of a committee to review the law and to activate the Gender Balance Index across various sectors. In August 2016,The GBC announced it would review the country's maternity law, and some private sector firms have already enhanced their policies.

In 2019 the organization awarded gender balance index awards – which celebrate efforts to reduce the gender gap within the federal government and to promote equal opportunities to genders. A tweet which celebrated the awards sparked derision on the social media sites as well as media outlets, with critics noting the awards being handed all to men. According to the Gender Balance Council, the awards were handed to the entities head, which happened to be men.

Responsibilities of the Council
The Gender Balance Council's goal is to achieve female empowerment. The GBC's role consists of bridging the gap between women and men and enhancing the UAE's global status in the matter. The GBC undertakes several legal roles, notably review of legislation introduced and policies proposed in the matter of gender balance, but also seeks to balance rights like nationality rights, divorce rights, guardianship and custody rights, inheritance rights, freedom of movement, protection from child, marriage, and protection from gender-based violence.

Structure 
The hierarchy of the council as of 2019 is as follows:

 Mona Al Marri, Director General of the Government of Dubai Media Office, Vice President of the Gender Balance Council
 Younis Haji Al Khouri, Undersecretary of the UAE Ministry of Finance
 Abdullah Nasser Lootah, Director-General of the Federal Competitiveness and Statistics Authority
 Noura Khalifa Al Suwaidi, Secretary-General of the General Women's Union
 Dr. Abdul Rahman Al Awar, Director-General of the Federal Authority of Government Human Resources
 Abdullah bin Ahmed Al Saleh, Undersecretary for Foreign Trade and Industry at the UAE Ministry of Economy
 Reem Al Falasi, Secretary-General of the Supreme Council for Motherhood and Childhood
 Dr. Omar Abdul Rahman Salem Al Nuaimi, Assistant Under-Secretary for Communications and International Relations at the Ministry of Human Resources and Emiratisation
 Hessa Tahlak, Assistant Undersecretary of Social Development  at the Ministry of Community Development 
 Huda Al Hashimi, Assistant Director-General for Strategy and Innovation at the Prime Minister's Office
 Abdullah Hamdan Al Naqbi, Director of the Legal Affairs Department at the Ministry of Foreign Affairs and International Cooperation 
 Shamsa Saleh, Secretary-General of the Gender Balance Council

See also 

Gender Equality Index
 Culture of the United Arab Emirates

References 

General references
Dubai ruler reaffirms UAE's commitment to gender equality at first council meeting

Gender equality
Women in the United Arab Emirates